Gowd Tappeh (also known as Gāv Tappeh) is a village in Padena-ye Vosta Rural District, Padena District, Semirom County, Isfahan Province, Iran. At the 2006 census, its population was 72, in 19 families.

References 

Populated places in Semirom County